Old Greenwood Cemetery is a historic cemetery located at Greenwood, Greenwood County, South Carolina. Established around the year 1860, the Old Greenwood Cemetery is a historic burial place in the said city. It is significant because of being the oldest cemetery in the area. This being said, it has also become the resting place for many prominent figures in the locale.

The Old Greenwood Cemetery was built as a graveyard for the old Main Street Methodist Church. It was laid out in the original site of the said church with an acre and a half of land area. It contains about 350 graves of pioneers and locals.

The descendants of the people buried on the Old Greenwood Cemetery mostly take responsibility in caring for the site. They work hard to keep vandals away and maintain the site the best that they can.

The cemetery was named to the National Register of Historic Places in 2002.

References

External links

 
 Old Greenwood Cemetery Historical Marker

Cemeteries on the National Register of Historic Places in South Carolina
Geography of Greenwood County, South Carolina
National Register of Historic Places in Greenwood County, South Carolina
Buildings and structures in Greenwood, South Carolina
Cemeteries established in the 1860s